Alphand may refer to:

 Hervé Alphand (1907-1994), French diplomat
 Jean-Charles Adolphe Alphand (1817-1891), engineer of the Second Empire of France 
 Luc Alphand (b. 1965), French skier and driver